George Porter (1622?–1683) was a royalist army officer of the First English Civil War.

Life
He was the eldest son of Endymion Porter and Olivia Butler. On 19 June 1641 Charles I recommended him to the Earl of Ormonde to be allowed to transport a regiment of a thousand of the disbanded soldiers of the Irish army for the service of Spain.

At the start of the Civil War he appears to have served under Prince Rupert, and then became commissary-general of horse in the army of the Earl of Newcastle. In March 1644 Porter was engaged in fortifying Lincoln, and at the battle of Marston Moor, where he was wounded, he held the rank of major-general of Newcastle's foot.

Parliament sent him to the Tower of London but later allowed him to be exchanged. On his release Porter became lieutenant-general and commander of the horse in the army of George Goring, Lord Goring, in the west of England. Over Goring, he was considered a bad influence. At Ilminster on 9 July 1645, he allowed Goring's cavalry to be surprised and routed by Edward Massey. Goring declared that he deserved to be shot, and a few weeks later told Edward Hyde that he suspected Porter of treachery as well as negligence; his final verdict was that "his brother-in-law was the best company, but the worst officer that ever served the king". Porter then quarrelled with Colonel Samuel Tuke, over promotion.

In November 1645 Porter obtained a pass from Sir Thomas Fairfax, abandoned the king's cause, and went to London. He made his peace with the parliamentary cause: the House of Commons remitted the fine of £1,000 which the committee for compounding had imposed upon him, and passed an ordinance for his pardon.

Porter was quarrelsome, and in 1646 and 1654 intended duels were prevented by official intervention. In 1659 he was engaged in the plots for the restoration of Charles II, but was not trusted by the royalists. After the king's return, he obtained the office of gentleman of the privy chamber to Catharine of Braganza and from 1677 served as a Groom of the Bedchamber to the King until his own death in 1683.

Family
Porter married Diana, daughter of George Goring, 1st Earl of Norwich, and widow of Thomas Covert of Slaugham, Sussex, by whom he had three sons and five daughters. His daughter Mary married Philip Smythe, 2nd Viscount Strangford.

References

Attribution

1620s births
1683 deaths
Date of birth unknown
English generals
Prisoners in the Tower of London
Royalist military personnel of the English Civil War